BI Cygni (BI Cyg, IRC +40408, BD+36 4025) is a red supergiant in the constellation Cygnus. It is an irregular variable star with a maximum brightness of magnitude 8.4 and a minimum of magnitude 9.9. It is less than a degree south of another variable red supergiant, BC Cygni.

BI Cyg is a slow irregular variable star classified as type Lc, an irregular supergiant.  Its brightness changes between extremes of magnitude 8.4 and 9.9.  Frequency analysis of its light curve shows no significant periods.

See also 
RW Cygni
KY Cygni
NML Cygni

References

External links
 INTEGRAL-OMC Catalogue of optically variable sources

M-type supergiants
Slow irregular variables
Cygnus (constellation)
Cygni, BI
J20212192+3655555
IRAS catalogue objects
Durchmusterung objects